The Yellow Card Scheme is the United Kingdom's system for collecting information on suspected adverse drug reactions (ADRs) to medicines. The scheme allows the safety of the medicines and vaccines that are on the market to be monitored.

History 
The scheme was founded in 1964 after the thalidomide disaster, and was developed by Bill Inman.  It is run by the Medicines and Healthcare products Regulatory Agency (MHRA) and the Commission on Human Medicines. It was extended to hospital pharmacists in 1997, and to community pharmacists in 1999.

The Yellow Card Centre Scotland is a joint venture between MHRA and the Scottish Government.

Scope 

Suspected adverse reactions are collected on all licensed medicines and vaccines, whether issued on prescription or bought over the counter from a pharmacist or supermarket.  The scheme also includes all herbal preparations and unlicensed medicines. Adverse reactions can be reported by anyone; this is usually done by healthcare professionals – including doctors, pharmacists and nurses – but patients and carers can also make reports.

The types of adverse reactions that should be reported are:
 Those that have caused death or a serious illness
 Any adverse reaction, however minor, if associated with a new medicine or one that is under continued monitoring (highlighted in the British National Formulary with a ▼ black triangle)
 Any adverse reaction, however minor, if associated with a child (under 18 years of age) or in pregnancy

Usage 
Reports can be entered through the MHRA's website, or a smartphone app which is available for iOS and Android devices. The app can also provide news and alerts to users.

Yellow Cards are available from pharmacies and a few are presented near the back of the BNF as tear-off pages; copies may also be obtained by telephoning +44 (0) 808 100 3352. The scheme provides forms that allow members of the public to report suspected side effects, as well as health professionals.

NHS Digital publishes an information standard DCB1582 for electronic submission of adverse reactions by IT systems (until 2014, this was ISB 1582 from the Information Standards Board). The specification is based on the ICH E2B (R2) international standard format.

See also 
EudraVigilance (European Medicines Agency)
Pharmacovigilance
Uppsala Monitoring Centre  (World Health Organization (WHO))
Vaccine Adverse Event Reporting System (USA)
VigiBase (WHO)

References

External links 

Commission on Human Medicines (CHM)

Pharmaceuticals policy
Pharmacy in the United Kingdom
Medical regulation in the United Kingdom
Drug safety